Cameron Heath Tovey (born 26 June 1985) is an Australian former professional basketball player who played eight seasons in the National Basketball League (NBL). While born in Malaysia, Tovey grew up in Perth and has always called Western Australia home.

Early life
Tovey was born in Penang, Malaysia. He grew up in Perth, Western Australia and attended Willetton Senior High School, where he was a member of the silver-medal winning team at the 2002 Australian National High School Tournament. Between 2003 and 2006, Tovey played for the Willetton Tigers in the State Basketball League (SBL), earning SBL Most Improved Player honours in 2004.

In 2004, Tovey moved to the United States to play college basketball for Augusta State University. In March 2005, he was named the Peach Belt Conference Freshman of the Year, becoming the fourth Jaguar to earn the Freshman of the Year award. Tovey was second on the team and 17th in the PBC in scoring with 11.6 points per game and was also ranked 10th in the PBC in assists with 3.2 per contest. He completed his freshman year having started all 30 games for the Jaguars, averaging 12.0 points, a team-high 7.4 rebounds, 3.2 assists and 1.5 steals per game. Following the conclusion of the Peach Belt Conference tournament, Tovey returned to Australia and ultimately did not return to Augusta.

Professional career

Perth Wildcats (2005–2006)
In June 2005, Tovey signed with his hometown team, the Perth Wildcats. However, his season was cut short after injuring his knee against West Sydney on 10 December 2005. In 22 games for the Wildcats in 2005–06, he averaged 4.5 points and 1.9 rebounds per game. In March 2006, he parted ways with the Wildcats.

Sydney Kings and Townsville Crocodiles (2006–2010)
In September 2006, Tovey competed with the Sutherland Sharks at the ABA National Finals, where he earned All-Star Five honours. Later that month, Tovey debuted for the Sydney Kings. In 32 games for the Kings in 2006–07, he averaged 5.0 points and 2.2 rebounds per game. After another stint with the Sutherland Sharks in 2007, Tovey helped the Kings win the minor premiership and reach the NBL Grand Final series in 2007–08. In his second season with the Kings, he averaged 6.0 points, 2.8 rebounds and 1.1 assists in 37 games.

After returning to Perth in 2008 for a stint with the Kalamunda Eastern Suns, Tovey joined the Townsville Crocodiles for the 2008–09 NBL season. In 2009, Tovey played for the Townsville Heat in the Queensland Basketball League and competed with the Australian University National Team in Serbia at the World University Summer Games. Tovey then returned to the Crocodiles for the 2009–10 season.

Second stint with the Wildcats (2010–2013)
Following the conclusion of the 2009–10 season, Tovey walked out on the Crocodiles to become an accountant, moving to Perth to begin a career with KPMG which he believed would not allow him to continue his sporting career. Considered one of the league's best defenders, Tovey believed his future career had to take precedence over his present day sporting ambitions. However, in May 2010, Tovey reversed his decision to retire and signed with the Perth Wildcats. In August 2010, Tovey helped the Willetton Tigers win their first SBL Championship with a 107–96 win over the Lakeside Lightning in the grand final. He was named MVP after finishing with 31 points, nine rebounds and seven assists.

Tovey's first season back with the Wildcats saw him hold down jobs as both an NBL basketballer and accountant at the same time. Despite this, he averaged career-best numbers in 2010–11 with 8.1 points, 5.0 rebounds and 2.6 assists per game. He subsequently re-joined the Willetton Tigers for the 2011 season, but he missed their finals run.

Over the following two seasons, Tovey helped the Wildcats reach back-to-back NBL Grand Finals, both resulting in losses to the New Zealand Breakers. On 28 March 2013, Tovey announced his decision to retire at the conclusion of the 2012–13 season.

Personal
Tovey is the son of David and Julie Tovey, and has two sisters, Stephanie and Hannah.

In September 2020, Tovey was elected Chairman of Willetton Basketball Association (WBA). He had served as finance director on the WBA Board for six years.

References

External links

Cam's Chinwag: The Final Chinwag
Cameron Tovey Q&A
NBL stats

1985 births
Living people
Augusta Jaguars men's basketball players
Australian men's basketball players
Australian expatriate basketball people in the United States
People from Penang
Perth Wildcats players
Shooting guards
Small forwards
Basketball players from Perth, Western Australia
Sydney Kings players
Townsville Crocodiles players